Vittoria was a schooner launched at Baltimore in 1811 under another name. British owners acquired her in 1813, probably as a prize, and renamed her. She became a privateer sailing out of Guernsey and captured at least three vessels trading between the United States and France. She disappeared from online records circa 1814, though she remains listed to 1818 with data unchanged from 1813. A French privateer may have captured her in 1814.

Origins
It would require original archival research to determine Vittorias origins. Two sources state that she was the American warship , which  captured on 14 August 1813, but that is highly improbable. Argus, of 299 tons (bm), was launched in 1802 at Boston; Vittoria, of 258–276 tons (bm), was launched in Baltimore in 1811. Vittoria first appeared in Lloyd's Lists ship arrival and departure data as arriving in Guernsey on 19 August 1813, and Pelican had captured Argus on 14 August.

There were American letters of marque named Argus. One, from Newburyport, Massachusetts, was a schooner of 275 tons (bm), but there is nothing beyond her name and size that would suggest that she might have become Vittoria. There is no report in either the London Gazette or Lloyd's List of a capture of an Argus in 1813 that might have become Vittoria.

Career
Vittoria first appeared in Lloyd's Register (LR) in 1813. 

"Victory", de Putron, master, arrived in Guernsey on 19 August 1813. Captain William de Putron acquired a letter of marque on 29 September. Thereafter, the Guernsey privateer Vittoria captured several French vessels that she sent into Guernsey.

Vrou Lounels, Holden, master, from Lorient to New York
Volunteer, Inoff, master, from Nantes to America
Pilot, Straford, master, from Savannah to Bordeaux

The same source that stated that Vittoria had been the American sloop USS Argus, reported that the Vittoria privateer, of Guernsey, had taken the Baltimore letter of marque schooner Eliza, of 272 tons (bm), five guns, and 38 men. There is no mention of such a capture in Lloyd's List.

Fate
Lloyd's List reported than the privateer  had captured Vittoria, sailing from Jersey to Newfoundland, but had given up her and some other British vessels that Invincible Napoleon had captured. It is not clear that the captured Vittoria was the Vittoria of this article. However, although Lloyd's Register continued to carry Vittorio until 1819 with unchanged data, she does not appear again in Lloyd's Lists ship arrival and departure data.

Note
There was a report in Lloyd's List in December 1813 that two French frigates had captured and destroyed the privateer Vittoria of Guernsey. However, the next issue stated that the report was in error. The vessel had been captured was the Falmouth Post Office Packet Service packet ship Little Catherine, which the Royal Navy had recaptured.

Notes

Citations

References
 
 

1811 ships
Ships built in Baltimore
Captured ships
Privateer ships of the United Kingdom